Samer Salem (born 2 November 1992) is a football plays for Hubuna as a winger.

External links 
 

1992 births
Living people
Al-Ahli Saudi FC players
Al-Raed FC players
Khaleej FC players
Al-Najma SC players
Al-Anwar Club players
Al-Tadamon SC (Saudi Arabia) players
Al-Suqoor FC players
Radwa Club players
Hubuna FC players
Saudi Arabian footballers
Sportspeople from Jeddah
Saudi Professional League players
Saudi Fourth Division players
Saudi Second Division players
Saudi Third Division players
Association football forwards